Hans Heinrich Raff (30 October 1910 – 13 May 1990) was a German middle-distance runner. He competed in the men's 3000 metres steeplechase at the 1936 Summer Olympics.

References

1910 births
1990 deaths
Athletes (track and field) at the 1936 Summer Olympics
German male middle-distance runners
German male steeplechase runners
Olympic athletes of Germany
Place of birth missing
20th-century German people